is a science fiction anime television series that aired on Tokyo MX in Japan from April 3, 2016, to September 25, 2016. The fourth television series set in the Macross universe, it is directed by Kenji Yasuda and written by Toshizo Nemoto with Shōji Kawamori being the chief director and mechanical designer, whith Chisato Mita (Capcom) handling the original character design. Kawamori is also credited as the original creator along Studio Nue.

Summary

Production
The series was sponsored by Big West Advertising and Bandai Visual. As with the previous Macross series, the Macross Delta staff have scouted new talent for the anime. Auditions began on December 1, 2014. On February 7, 2015, it was reported that over 8,000 people auditioned to star in the new series. The final selection round was held in Tokyo in late April 2015. The finalists went through interviews with the judges, and demonstrated their singing and voice performing skills.

Macross Delta held a Chō Jikū' Seisaku Happyōkai" ("The Super Dimension" Production Unveiling), a live-streamed event that revealed more details on the project on October 29 at 12:00 p.m. Kawamori appeared at the event to reveal the main staff, the winner of the audition for the new singer in the anime, and the new anime's characters.

Promotional media
A promotional visual created by artist Hidetaka Tenjin an depicting 2 fictional dogfighting aircraft was posted in the franchise's official website on Friday the 25th September 2015. Kawamori confirmed that both fighters in the visual are "Valkyries" (transforming variable fighters), and he specifically cited the old Swedish jet fighter Saab 35 Draken as an inspiration for the darker Valkyrie in the background of the image. Kawamori added that he has been a fan of the Draken jet since he was a child. He also acknowledged that the blue and white Valkyrie in the foreground shares a design lineage with previous variable fighters in the Macross series and therefore was less of a challenge to design. By contrast, the background variable fighter will feature a relatively new transformation scheme that bears little similarity to those of previous Valkyries.

Shoji Kawamori explained that the two fighters have exhausts in different colors because they were developed by different companies. He also noted that he has been deliberately avoiding more direct design inspirations from current real world fighters, since stealth technology has made modern combat aircraft look too similar and harder to distinguish from each other. Kawamori added that this new series will emphasize "Valkyrie versus Valkyrie" duels as opposed to previous television series. While video productions such as Macross Plus and Macross Zero prominently featured variable fighters against each other, Kawamori admitted that it has not been the focus in a Macross television series in a long time.

The staff also presented the official designs by Shōji Kawamori for the two main variable fighters: the VF-31 Siegfried and the Sv-262 Draken III. The VF-31 is flown by the Walküre group's escorts, the "Delta Flight". Kawamori confirmed that the VF-31 is an update of the YF-30 Chronos that appeared in the PlayStation 3 video game Macross 30: Voices across the Galaxy. However, unlike the YF-30 the VF-31 design has built-in gunpods in its arms and forward-swept wings.

The Sv-262 is used by the Aerial Knights Valkyrie Aerial Knights of the Windermere Kingdom. The new variable fighter design was inspired by the real-life Saab 35 Draken. While describing the Sv-262, Kawamori mentioned that this is the first time that a Valkyrie with this unique delta wing design variant has appeared in Macross. Hidetaka Tenjin also noted that unlike other Valkyries its cockpit is not transparent.

New series logo
The Macross Delta logo features a planet within the Japanese characters that form the word "Macross". Shoji Kawamori specifically noted that this planet is the main setting for the new series. He also explained that this was made deliberately in direct contrast with Macross Frontier, whose setting was primarily in space. Kawamori started to describe more details about Macross Delta'''s setting but stopped short and asked fans to watch "The Super Dimension" Production Unveiling event.

Kawamori pointed out that the delta symbol in the logo is made of triangular symbols to symbolize the three main thematic elements of Macross: music, a love triangle, and Valkyries. However, he also noted that the two symbols are split, and explained that this is indicative that the three elements will not come together as expected in the new story.

The Super Dimension Production Unveiling
18-year old Minori Suzuki from Aichi Prefecture was announced as the winner of the newest Macross singer auditions. Suzuki plays Freyja Wion, an aspiring idol who is full of spirit and who is always smiling. Other characters include five girls that form the "Tactical Sound Unit Walküre", the first major songstress group in the Macross anime franchise. (Macross 7 had the "Jamming Birds" group, and the PlayStation video game Macross Digital Mission VF-X had the group "Milky Dolls").

Hidetaka Tenjin is credited as the "Macross visual artist" for this series while Majiro (Barakamon, Nagareboshi Lens) and Yuu Shindo (My Teen Romantic Comedy SNAFU, Persona 4: The Golden Animation) adapted the original character designs by Chisato Mita (designer in Capcom's E.X. Troopers video game). Other non-Japanese staff members include Thomas Romain as worldview designer, Vincento Niemu as art designer, and Stanislas Brunet as mechanical designer.

Bandai also presented prototypes of the DX Chōgōkin models of both fighters.

Media

Anime

A Macross Delta Preview Special was aired on Japanese television on New Year's Eve in 2015, with the all-but complete first episode.

The anime premiered on Tokyo MX and BS11, along other stations in Japan on April 3, 2016. The series used twelve musical themes: two openings and ten endings.

A compilation film with some plot changes, Macross Delta the Movie: Passionate Walküre was released in Japanese theaters on February 9, 2018.

A new film, Macross Delta the Movie: Absolute Live!!!!!!, serving as a sequel to Passionate Walküre, was released in Japanese theaters on October 8, 2021.

Manga
Four manga adaptations were officially serialized, all released in June 2016. The first one was serialized in Kodansha's Monthly Shōnen Sirius. The second, titled  was written by Shoji Kawamori and serialized in Kodansha's Magazine Special. The third, was serialized in Ichijinsha's Monthly Comic Rex. The last, was also serialized in Monthly Comic Rex.

Music
Singles

Albums

Songs

International release

Due to a current legal dispute over the distribution rights of the Macross franchise, involving Studio Nue and Big West against Harmony Gold, much of the Macross merchandise post 1999, including Macross Delta, have not received an international release.

However, on March 1, 2021, Big West, Studio Nue and Harmony Gold reached an agreement on the international distribution of most Macross'' sequels and films.

Reception
Richard Eisenbeis from Kotaku gives the preview episode a mixed review. He praised the episode's beginning for introducing the basic setting and shows the first meeting of Freyja, Hayate, and Mirage along with some short character building scenes for each, but criticised halfway point of the episode. Despite praising the aerial dogfight, he thinks the sudden conflict and the introduction of 15 different characters was "far too much too fast". For the music, while the first two Walkure songs are deemed forgettable, he thinks the final song used for the ending and credits, "Ikenai Borderline", is great. Richard's main problem is Walkure themselves, referring them as the elephant in the room. He commented "While their "magic" is clearly technology-based, it is something so unexpected in a Macross anime, it's likely to throw even longtime fans for a loop—I know it did me". Nevertheless, he genuinely interested to see more and hopes much of the information will be sorted out by the time the series makes its true premiere this spring.

References

External links
  
 

2016 anime television series debuts
Japanese idols in anime and manga
Delta
Television series set in the 2060s
TBS Television (Japan) original programming
Mainichi Broadcasting System original programming
Mecha anime and manga
PlayStation Vita-only games
PlayStation Vita games